Live at the Gods 2002 is a live video album released by the hard rock band Harem Scarem, issued in Europe and Japan in 2002. The album was also released as a live CD. In Canada the DVD and CD were published in May 2004 under the name Rubber.

Track listing

Band members
Harry Hess - lead vocals, guitar, producer.
Pete Lesperance - lead guitar, backing vocals, producer.
Barry Donaghy - bass, backing vocals.
Creighton Doane - drums, backing vocals.

References

2002 live albums
Harem Scarem albums
Frontiers Records video albums
Frontiers Records live albums
2002 video albums